The Banja Monastery is a Serbian Orthodox Monastery located near Priboj, Serbia. Monastery Banja presents Cultural Monument of Exceptional Importance in Serbia.

History 
 
Time of founding of the monastery is unknown, but the first historical sources (Studenica Typicon) mention it in the 12th century. In 1220 Banja became center of Serbian Orthodox Eparchy of Dabar. There are three churches within the monastery, the Church of St. Nicholas, of St. Eliah and the Church of Ascension of the Holy Virgin. St. Nicholas Church, the main monastery church, was founded by King Stefan Dečanski (r. 1322–31) in 1329. The original church was burned during the Ottoman invasion. The church was restored in 1570 and gained its present look in 1904 when the last restoration took place. The monastery was not only center of the bishopric but the mausoleum of Vojnović noble family.

See also 
 Cultural Monuments of Exceptional Importance
 Tourism in Serbia
 Serbian Orthodox Church
 Priboj

References

Bibliography

External links 
 

14th-century Serbian Orthodox church buildings
Serbian Orthodox monasteries in Serbia
Nemanjić dynasty endowments
Priboj
Cultural Monuments of Exceptional Importance (Serbia)
1329 establishments in Europe
Religious organizations established in the 1320s
Christian monasteries established in the 14th century
Medieval Serbian Orthodox monasteries
Gothic architecture in Serbia